All Tied Up is a 1994 comedy film directed by John Mark Robinson and starring Zach Galligan, Teri Hatcher, and Lara Harris. It was filmed in Los Angeles, California, United States.

Plot
Brian (Zach Galligan) buys an engagement ring for Linda (Teri Hatcher), his girlfriend who is out of town. She returns early and catches him in bed with another woman, the latest in a series of infidelities. She dumps him. He forces his way into the house she shares with roommates Kim and Sharon, hoping to reconcile with Linda. He knocks himself out and the women tie him to a bed for several days, "Home Shopping Network" blaring. They dress him in a skirt, shave him with a rusty razor, feed him only squash, buy jewelry on his credit card, and nearly cost him his job by preventing him from going to an important interview. Linda ultimately releases him.

Brian remains smitten and returns to the house after a few days, kidnaps Linda and brings her to his own house where he ties her to a chair. She is unpersuaded of his love and he releases her, but she later changes her mind and they reconcile with the agreement that she will be able to tie him up during future sexual escapades.

Cast
Zach Galligan as Brian Hartley 
Teri Hatcher as Linda Alissio 
Lara Harris as Kim Roach 
Tracy Griffith as Sharon Stevens 
Abel Folk as Max 
Edward Blatchford as Detective Frank Steinham 
Olivia Brown as Tara 
Rachel Sweet as J.J. 
Melora Walters as Bliss 
Viviane Vives (credited as Vivianne Vives) as Carmen
Phyllis Chase as Bone's Agent 
Alvino Johnson as Slim Jim Bone'''

External links

1994 films
1994 comedy films
Films shot in Los Angeles
American comedy films
Films scored by Bernardo Bonezzi
Films about kidnapping
1990s English-language films
1990s American films